Woltersteich is a lake in Süsel, Holsteinische Schweiz, Schleswig-Holstein, Germany. Its surface area is 0.36 km².

Ponds of Schleswig-Holstein
LWoltersteich